"Mr. Garrison's Fancy New Vagina" is the first episode in the ninth season of the American animated television series South Park. It first aired on Comedy Central in the United States on March 9, 2005. In the episode, Mr. Garrison undergoes a sex change after feeling that he is a "woman trapped in a man's body". Garrison's operation inspires Kyle and his father Gerald to undergo cosmetic surgery themselves.

Written and directed by series co-creator Trey Parker, the episode is rated TV-MA in the United States.

Plot
Seeing himself as a "woman trapped in a man's body", Mr. Garrison decides to have a sex change, performed by Dr. Biber of the Trinidad Medical Center (with a video clip depicting an actual sex change operation being shown). He is later introduced as "Mrs. Garrison" at a supermarket. Meanwhile, Kyle is trying out for the all-state basketball team. However, his performance against his African American competitors is unimpressive (by a physical standpoint, considering that he is too small compared to his taller competitors), and the coach and Cartman tell him that "Jews can't play basketball". This depresses Kyle, and when he, Stan, Cartman and Kenny are walking home, Mr. Garrison tells the boys of his surgery.

At dinner, Kyle asks his parents what a sex change is, and while explaining the term, his mother Sheila insists that cosmetic surgery is an important and legitimate aid for people whose physical appearance contrasts with their self-image. However, in applauding Mrs. Garrison's courage, she inadvertently implies that Kyle's own problems can be solved similarly. Stan accompanies Kyle to Trinidad to see about the situation, and Dr. Biber suggests that Kyle undergo a "negroplasty" to make him African-American, which outrages his parents when Kyle explains his plight. His father Gerald travels to the Institute in order to confront Dr. Biber, who spots Gerald's dolphin shirt, appeals to his affinity for dolphins and convinces him to undergo "dolphinoplasty", surgically altering his appearance to resemble a dolphin's. At his home, Mr. Garrison asks Mr. Slave to take him to bed, but Mr. Slave, upset that he was never asked his feelings regarding the operation, refuses and breaks up with him.

As he has now been persuaded to endorse cosmetic surgery, Gerald Broflovski allows Kyle to undergo the negroplasty. Meanwhile, Mr. Garrison, puzzled at not having had his period, believes he's pregnant and cheerfully decides to have an abortion, but the abortionist says that due to lacking ovaries or a uterus, he cannot do any of the above (it is then revealed that the primary reason for having sex-reassignment surgery was to get pregnant and abort the resulting fetus). He demands Dr. Biber to change his sex back, but learns that the operation is irreversible, as his former testicles have been transplanted into Kyle's knees to make him taller, and his former scrotum fashioned into Mr. Broflovski's dorsal fin.

At the all-state basketball game, Mr. Garrison, Dr. Biber, Mr. Broflovski, and the other three boys try to stop Kyle from playing basketball, as any jumping could cause Mr. Garrison's testicles to explode. In the dramatic climax, Kyle goes up to dunk and when he lands his new "kneecaps" explode, covering everyone in blood and semen. Dr. Biber then apologizes to Kyle and Gerald, saying he should have told them that their surgeries were cosmetic only; he then offers to reverse the surgeries for a nominal fee, which they accept, as they are shown returned to normal in later episodes. Conversely, Mrs. Garrison, having lost her testicles, decides to accept her new gender, while breaking the fourth wall to the audience saying that she is staying a woman.

Production
According to the DVD commentary for "Mr. Garrison's Fancy New Vagina", Trey Parker and Matt Stone came into the season with "basically no ideas". "Mr. Garrison's Fancy New Vagina" and "Die Hippie, Die" were the first two episodes that were brainstormed just prior to the start of the production season. Parker said that they originally had an idea for an episode about hippies and an episode where Garrison undergoes a sex change but just "basically winged" the rest of the season's episodes.

Parker stated that several days before this episode's air date, he was so stressed that he nearly "pulled a Dave Chappelle" and gave up. The scene in which Garrison undergoes his sex change originally featured over five minutes of real sex change footage because of the lack of ideas. Eventually, the sex change footage was trimmed to three brief one second shots after Comedy Central disapproved and after the idea of Gerald Broflovski's dolphin operation was brought up. The idea for Kyle wanting to play basketball came from Parker's desire to play for the Denver Broncos.

References

External links
 "Mr. Garrison's Fancy New Vagina" Full episode at South Park Studios
 

LGBT-related South Park episodes
South Park (season 9) episodes
Transgender-related television episodes
Works about educators
LGBT-related controversies in animation
LGBT-related controversies in television
Obscenity controversies in animation
Obscenity controversies in television